Hawkesbury Airport  is located  west of Hawkesbury, Ontario, Canada, near the Ottawa River and the border with Quebec.

History
The airport was built in the early 1940s by the Royal Canadian Air Force as part of the British Commonwealth Air Training Plan and served as the primary relief landing field for No. 13 Elementary Flying Training School in nearby Saint-Eugène, Ontario. The aerodrome was declared surplus by the RCAF on 16 December 1944 and the property was turned over to the Department of Transport on 17 February 1945.

Accidents
14 June 1999, a Schempp-Hirth Standard Cirrus crashed on approach, killing the pilot.

See also
 List of airports in the Montreal area

References

Registered aerodromes in Ontario
Hawkesbury, Ontario
Royal Canadian Air Force stations
Military airbases in Ontario
Airports of the British Commonwealth Air Training Plan
Military history of Ontario